David Goffin was the defending champion, but withdrew before the competition began.

Daniil Medvedev won the title, defeating Kei Nishikori in the final, 6–2, 6–4.

Seeds

Draw

Finals

Top half

Bottom half

Qualifying

Seeds

Qualifiers

Qualifying draw

First qualifier

Second qualifier

Third qualifier

Fourth qualifier

External links
Main draw
Qualifying draw

Rakuten Japan Open Tennis Championships Singles